Ichneutica paracausta is a moth of the family Noctuidae. This species is endemic to New Zealand. It is found locally in the central North Island, is widespread in the South Island and can also be found in Stewart Island. I. paracausta is variable in colour, but as it has a distinctive black streak on its forewing as well as a wing pattern that is characteristic, I. paracausta is unlikely to be confused with other species. It is present on the North Island volcanic plateau as well as Little Bush Reserve in Hawkes Bay in the North Island as well as in tussock grassland, alpine and subalpine shrubland and in alpine forest. Larvae have been recorded as feeding on grasses, a pupa has been found in a cocoon under the bark of a tree and adult moths are on the wing from October to January.

Taxonomy 
This species was first described by Edward Meyrick in 1887 using two specimens collected at Castle Hill by John Davies Enys. Meyrick originally named the species Mamestra paracausta. The lectotype is held at the Canterbury Museum. In 1988 J. S. Dugdale, in his catalogue on New Zealand lepidopera, placed this species within the Graphania genus. In 2019 Robert Hoare undertook a major review of New Zealand Noctuidae species. During this review the genus Ichneutica was greatly expanded and the genus Graphania was subsumed into that genus as a synonym. As a result of this review, this species is now known as Ichneutica paracausta.

Description 
Alfred Philpott described the larva of this species as follows:

Meyrick described the adult of this species as follows:
The wingspan of the adult male of I. paracausta is between 33 and 38 mm and the female wingspan is between 36 and 42 mm. This species is variable in colour, but as it has a distinctive black streak on its forewing as well as a wing pattern that is characteristic, I. paracausta is unlikely to be confused with other species.

Distribution 
This species is endemic to New Zealand. I. paracausta is found locally in the central North Island, is widespread in the South Island and can also be found in Stewart Island. I. paracausta can be found down to sea level in Southland.

Habitat 
This species is known from the North Island volcanic plateau as well as in Little Bush Reserve in the Hawkes Bay as well as in tussock grassland, alpine and subalpine shrubland and in alpine forest in the South Island.

Behaviour 
This species is on the wing from October to January.

Life history and host species 
Knowledge about the life history of this species needs to be increased. Larvae have been recorded as feeding on various grasses. Pupa have been found in a slight cocoon under the bark of a tree.

References 

Moths described in 1887
Hadeninae
Moths of New Zealand
Endemic fauna of New Zealand
Taxa named by Edward Meyrick
Endemic moths of New Zealand